Seán Dunne (18 December 1918 – 25 June 1969) was a trade union leader and Irish Labour Party politician. He was a Teachta Dála (TD) from 1948 to 1957 and from 1961 to 1969.

Early life
Dunne was born in Waterford, to Michael Dunne, an RIC constable, and Bridget Coppinger, a schoolteacher. On 10 May 1920, in an ambush at nearby Ahawadda, his father and two other constables were killed by Irish Volunteers in an ambush. Dunne subsequently grew up in his mother's native area of Waterford.

At 16 he became involved in the Labour and Republican movements. He joined the Workers' Union of Ireland (WUI) in 1936 and led "hunger marches" in 1937. As a republican he was interned in the Curragh and Arbour Hill Prison for the first two years of the Second World War, rejoining the WUI on his release. In 1944 he became Secretary of the Agricultural Workers' section of the WUI. It was eventually decided that a separate union was required for agricultural workers and in May 1946 the Federation of Rural Workers was founded with Dunne as Organising Secretary, a post he held until 1954. Dunne organised many strikes among rural workers, and was instrumental in achieving the weekly half-day for members in the early 1950s.

Political career
Dunne first stood for election to Dáil Éireann in the Dublin County constituency at the by-election held on 29 October 1947, as a Labour Party candidate, following the death of Fianna Fáil TD Patrick Fogarty. He finished last of the four candidates; the seat was won by Seán MacBride, leader of the new Clann na Poblachta party, who would become Minister for External Affairs in 1948.

At the 1948 general election, Dunne stood again in Dublin County, and won the third of the three seats. He was elected without reaching the quota and took his seat in the 13th Dáil.

He was re-elected at the 1951 general election and again at the 1954 general election, but did not contest the 1957 general election. He stood again in Dublin County at the 1961 election as an independent candidate, when he was returned to the 17th Dáil. He joined the Labour Party in 1963. He held his seat at the 1965 general election, this time as a Labour Party candidate. He constantly carried "Leabhar Ballyfermot", a notebook containing his constituents' problems. His frequent boast was: "If Dunne can't do it, it can't be done". He had the distinction of being ejected from two parliaments, Dáil Éireann and Stormont, as well as British Labour Party conferences. Seán MacEntee once labelled him "an extreme communist".

Dunne died aged 50 on 25 June 1969, only seven days after being returned at the 1969 general election for the Dublin South-West constituency, before he could sign the roll in the 19th Dáil. The by-election for his seat was held on 4 March 1970, and won for Fianna Fáil by Seán Sherwin; the Labour candidate, Matt Merrigan, lost by only 262 votes after Dunne's widow Cora stood as an independent candidate.

References

External links
Haughey, Ryan and Dunne Address Voters 1969. Radio Archives RTE.

1918 births
1969 deaths
Irish trade unionists
Labour Party (Ireland) TDs
Independent TDs
Members of the 13th Dáil
Members of the 14th Dáil
Members of the 15th Dáil
Members of the 17th Dáil
Members of the 18th Dáil
Members of the 19th Dáil